Bjarke Ingels Group, often referred to as BIG, is a Copenhagen and New York based group of architects, designers and builders operating within the fields of architecture, urbanism, research and development. The office is currently involved in a large number of projects throughout Europe, North America, Asia and the Middle East. As of 2021, the company employs 600 people.

History
Bjarke Ingels and Julien De Smedt established the company PLOT in Copenhagen in January 2001, as a focus for their architectural practice. Ingels established BIG in late 2005 after he and De Smedt closed down PLOT.  This drew acclaim for its first completed commission, the Mountain, a residential project in Copenhagen which had been started by PLOT. Over the next couple of years, BIG's projects included a waste-to-energy plant which doubles as a ski-slope in Copenhagen, Denmark, the West 57th Street mixed-use tower in midtown Manhattan for Durst Fetner Residential, the National Art Gallery of Greenland in Nuuk, the headquarters for the Shenzhen Energy Company in Shenzhen, and the Kimball Art Center in Utah.

In 2009 a plan was mooted for turning Boyuk Zira Island into a carbon-neutral eco-resort and recreation centre with a profile based on Azerbaijan's seven best-known peaks. The cost of the project, known as "The dream island", by Danish architects Bjarke Ingels Group (BIG), would have been around two billion US dollars.

In December 2009, the company's partnership was expanded to include Thomas Christoffersen, Jakob Lange, Finn Nørkjaer, Andreas Klok Pedersen, David Zahle, CEO Sheela Maini Søgaard, and Kai-Uwe Bergmann. In 2010, they opened a branch office in New York City, where they were commissioned to design the VIA 57 West courtscraper for Durst Fetner Residential.

At a lecture at the Royal Academy in July 2015, BIG proposed turning the Battersea Power Station in London into "the world's tallest Tesla coils."

In 2015, BIG added four new partners: Beat Schenk and Daniel Sundlin in New York and Brian Yang and Jakob Sand in Copenhagen.

In May 2016, BIG partnered with Hyperloop One, Deutsche Bahn, and SYSTRA to develop a test of the high-speed, low friction Hyperloop concept.

In March 2017, BIG signed a lease for an office in the Brooklyn neighborhood Dumbo, keeping its Manhattan office at the same time.  The firm, then 250 people in Manhattan's financial district, all moved to Dumbo.

After an Instagram post showing that 11 of 12 partners at BIG were men, BIG CEO Sheela Maini Sogaard defend the firm's gender balance and stated they had created a "pipeline of diverse talent" that would eventually be "trickling up" into the partner group.

In March 2018, BIG was named as the first high-profile architecture firm to be commissioned to design a public structure in Albania, specifically the replacement building for the aging National Theatre of Albania. Plans to demolish and replace the old national theater with a building by BIG resulted in the National Theatre Protest in Albania in 2019, as the old building was considered historic. The demolition on 17 May 2020 resulted in continued protests and detainment of protestors by authorities.

The company has met with criticism for designing for repressive regimes. The firm in 2019 designed renderings for Wildflower Studios, Robert De Niro's movie studio in Queens, New York.

BIG released a revision of its design proposal for the new Oakland Ballpark in February 2019, retaining its rooftop park with community access and developing "3.3 million square feet of housing, 1.5 million square feet of commercial and office space, a hotel and a performance center in the area surrounding the stadium." They've also worked on zoo enclosures. It was building a city layout for Toyota in January 2020, to replace a former factory site near Mount Fuji. In February 2020, BIG took its first sofa design commission, for a Danish furniture company.

In July 2021, BIG added seven additional partners for a total of 24: Andy Young, Lorenzo Boddi, João Albuquerque, Douglass Alligood, Lars Larsen, Giulia Frittoli, and Daria Pahhota.

In 2022, construction concluded on two Quito-based projects designed by BIG and Moshe Safdie's firm Safdie Architects. Commissioned by Quito developer Uribe Schwarzkopf, the neighboring towers known as Qorner and Iqon rise 24 and 32 floors respectively.

Divisions

BIG IDEAS Lab 
Launched in 2014, the division is part R&D lab, part incubator for BIG design concepts that can be spun off into independent products or companies.

The lab was founded to build the steam-ring generator for the Amager Bakke - the Copenhagen power plant with a ski slope on its roof - which will "puff" every time it emits a tonne of carbon dioxide. It is now working on numerous BIG collaborations and spin-off projects, including a smart internet-connected lock named Friday, "a company that creates water from super-efficient dehumidification", and Urban Rigger - floating student housing for coastal cities built from repurposed shipping containers. The first are scheduled to be built in Gothenburg, Sweden in 2016.

Other projects include Fingerprint Façade, Window Garden, and a gigantic Tesla coil for the Battersea Power Station in London.

Projects

Completed projects

 Copenhagen Harbour Baths, Designed by BIG & JDS, Copenhagen (completed 2002)
 Maritime Youth House, Designed by BIG & JDS, Copenhagen (completed 2004)
 Psychiatric Hospital, Designed by BIG & JDS, Helsingor, Denmark (completed 2005)
 VM Houses, Designed by BIG & JDS, Ørestad, Copenhagen (completed 2006)
 M2 Hill House, Denmark
 Sjakket Community Building, Designed by BIG & JDS, Copenhagen (completed 2007)
 Mountain Dwellings, Ørestad, Copenhagen (completed 2008)
 Gyeonggi Museum of Modern Art, Gyeonggi, Korea
 8 House, Ørestad, Copenhagen (2010)
 Danish Expo Pavilion 2010, EXPO 2010, Shanghai, China
 Times Square Valentine, New York City, USA (completed 2012)
 Superkilen, innovative park in the Nørrebro district of Copenhagen (competition win 2008, completed 2012)
 Heinemann Regionals Taxfree Store, Copenhagen Airport, Copenhagen, Denmark
 Danish Maritime Museum, Helsingør, Denmark (completed 2013)
 Gammel Hellerup Gymnasium - Sports Hall & Cultural building, Hellerup, Denmark (completed 2013 & 2015)
 1200 Intrepid - office building in Philadelphia
 Warehouse 421, Mina Zayed, Abu Dhabi, United Arab Emirates
 The BIG Maze, National Building Museum, Washington D.C (completed 2014)
 VIA 57 West, New York City, United States (completed 2016)
 Tirpitz Museum, Blåvand, Denmark (completed 2017)
 LEGO House, Billund, Denmark (completed 2018)
79&Park, Stockholm, Sweden (completed 2018)
Isenberg Business Innovation Hub at the University of Massachusetts Amherst in Amherst, Massachusetts (completed 2019)
H-B Woodlawn Secondary School, Arlington, Virginia, United States
 Amager Bakke, Copenhagen, Denmark (completed 2017)
 Vancouver House
 Audemars Piguet Museum, La Maison des Fondateurs, La Vallée de Joux, Le Brassus, Switzerland (completed 2020)

Under construction
 The XI, New York City, New York, United States 
 The BIG U, New York City, New York, United States 
 Grove at Grand Bay, Miami, Florida, United States 
 Hualien Residences, Hualien, Taiwan
 Serpentine Summer Pavilion 2016, London, England, United Kingdom
 Washington Redskins Stadium (name change pending), Washington D.C., United States
 Google North Bayshore Campus, Mountain View, California, United States
 Google King's Cross Campus, London, United Kingdom 
 Transitlager Dreispitz, Basel, Switzerland (competition win, November 2011)
 Faroe Islands Education Centre, Thorshavn, Faroe Islands (competition win, December 2009)
 Shenzhen International Energy Mansion, Shenzhen, China (competition win, September 2009)
 Honeycomb / Albany Marina Residences, Building One, Nassau, Bahamas,
 Vancouver House, Vancouver, BC, Canada
 Telus Sky Tower, Calgary, Alberta, Canada 
 Zootopia, Givskud, Denmark 
 New Tamayo Museum, Mexico City, Mexico (competition win, April 2009)
 New Tallinn City Hall, Tallinn, Estonia (competition win, June 2009)
 World Village of Women Sports, Malmö, Sweden (competition win, November 2009)
 National Gallery, Nuuk, Greenland (competition win, February 2011)
 Paris PARC, Paris, France (competition win, November 2011) 
 Koutalaki Ski Village, Levi, Finland (competition win, 2011)
 Kimball Art Centre, Park City, Utah, United States (competition win, February 2012)
 Cross # Towers, Seoul, South Korea
 Maison de l'Économie Créative et de la Culture en Aquitaine, Bordeaux, France (competition win, April 2012)
 The Red Line, Tampere, Finland (competition win, May 2012)
 Rose Rock International Finance Center, Tianjin, China
 Phoenix Observation Tower, Phoenix, Arizona, US
 Smithsonian Institution South Campus Master Plan, Washington D.C., United States
 NYPD 40th Precinct, Bronx, New York, United States
 The Spiral, New York City, New York, United States
 Metzler High-Rise, Frankfurt, Germany
 Battersea Power Station Malaysia Square, London, England, United Kingdom
 King Street West, Toronto, Ontario, Canada
 Frederiksborgvej 73, Copenhagen, Denmark
 
 Västerås Travel Center, Västerås, Sweden
 Vinterbad Bryggen, Copenhagen, Denmark
 Saint Thomas Church Extension, Copenhagen, Denmark
 Pittsburgh Lower Hill Master Plan, Pittsburgh, Pennsylvania, United States 
 Kistefos Museum, Jevnaker, Norway
 Esbjerg Towers, Esbjerg, Denmark (Cactus Towers)
London Bridge
3 West 29th Street, New York City
 Central Embassy Extension, Bangkok, Thailand
 IQON, Quito, Ecuador
 EPIQ, Quito, Ecuador

Awards 

 2008 Forum AID Award for Best Building in Scandinavia in 2008 (for Mountain Dwellings)
 2008 World Architecture Festival Award for Best Residential Building (for Mountain Dwellings)
 2009 ULI Award for Excellence  (for Mountain Dwellings)
 2011 Prix Delarue, French Academy of Architecture, Paris 
 2013 Progressive Architecture Award for Kimball Art Center
 2013 Red Dot Award: Product Design, 'Best of the Best' | Architecture & Urban Design (for Superkilen)
 2013 International Olympic Committee Award, Gold Medal (for Superkilen)
 2013 ArchDaily Buildings of the Year (for Superkilen)
 2013 Mies Van Der Rohe Award, Finalist (for Superkilen)
 2013 Den Danske Lyspris (for Gammel Hellerup High School)
 2014 Architizer A+ Awards Jury Winner (for the Danish Maritime Museum and Gammel Hellerup Gymnasium)
 2014 Honor Award, American Institute of Architects (for the Danish Maritime Museum)
 2014 Royal Institute of British Architects Awards European National Winner (for the Danish Maritime Museum)
 2014 European Prize of Architecture Philippe Rotthier (for the Danish Maritime Museum)
 2014 Archdaily Cultural Building of the Year (for the Danish Maritime Museum) 
 2014 Re-thinking the Future, First Award (for Vancouver House)
 2014 Den Nordiske Lyspris (for Gammel Hellerup Gymnasium)
 2014 World Architecture Festival Cultural Category Winner (for the Danish Maritime Museum)
 2015 American Institute of Architects National Honor Award for Regional and Urban Design (for The DryLine resiliency project)
 2015 Global Holcim Award for Sustainable Construction, Bronze (for The DryLine resiliency project)
 2015 National Council of Structural Engineers Associations Awards, Excellence Award in Structural Engineering (for Grove at Grand Bay)
 2015 World Architecture Festival Future Project of the Year (for Vancouver House)
 2016 American Institute of Architects Honor Awards, Regional and Urban Design Award (for Smithsonian South Campus Master Plan)
 2016 Building Design Magazine World Architecture 100 Awards, 2nd Most Admired Architectural Practice
 2016 American Institute of Architects New York Chapter design Awards, Honor Award (for 2 World Trade Center)
 2016 International Highrise Award, for VIA 57 West

Exhibitions

 2007 BIG City, Storefront for Art and Architecture, New York
 2009 Yes is More, Danish Architecture Centre, Copenhagen
 2010 Yes is More, CAPC Bordeaux
 2014 The BIG Maze, National Building Museum
 2015 HOT TO COLD, National Building Museum

Publications
 Hot to Cold: An Odyssey of Architectural Adaptation, Taschen - 2015
 Yes Is More: Yes Is More: An Archicomic on Architectural Evolution, Taschen - 2009
 Museum in the Dock, Arvinius + Orfeus Publishing - 2014
 Superkilen Book, Arvinius + Orfeus Publishing - 2013
 AV Monograph BIG, Arquitectura Viva - 2013
 Being BIG by Abitare, Abitare - 2012
 BIG Red Book, Ada Edita Global Architecture - 2012
 BIG Pink Book, Archilife - 2010 
 BIG Bjarke Ingels Group Projects 2001-2010, Design Media Publishing Ltd - 2011
 A Project as an Icon, an Icon as a Project, in STUDIO Architecture and Urbanism magazine Issue#03 Icon, Milano, edited by Romolo Calabrese, 2012 Article

References

External links

 Official website

Companies based in Copenhagen Municipality
Architecture firms of Denmark
Architecture firms based in Copenhagen
Design companies established in 2005